The Peace Prize Medal (Danish: De Blå Beretters Fredsprismedalje) was instituted in 1995 by Queen Margrethe II and may be awarded to any Dane who has completed a tour of duty on a UN mission and has received a medal for it. UN veterans are allowed to apply for the medal themselves thus making this the only Danish medal that the recipient himself can apply for.

The medal commemorates the 1988 Nobel Peace Prize given to United Nations Department of Peacekeeping Operations personnel. Persons who have been deployed with the UN before 1988 may attach a silver laurel branch to the ribbon of the medal.

See also
List of orders, decorations, and medals of the Kingdom of Denmark
Peacekeeping
United Nations Medal
Canadian Peacekeeping Service Medal

References 

Orders, decorations, and medals of Denmark